Charles Belmont Davis (1866 - 1926) was a writer, drama critic, and publisher. Several of his stories were adapted into  films including his short story "The Octopus" which was adapted into Mother o' Mine (1921). His short story "When Johnny Comes Marching Home" which appeared in the October 1914 issue of Metropolitan Magazine was adapted into The Home Stretch (1921). His story "Handle with Care" was adapted into Handle with Care (1922 film).

He wrote a couple stories for Harper's Magazine.

His mother was pioneering writer and social reformer Rebecca Harding Davis and his older brother was Richard Harding Davis. The brothers attended Lehigh University and were involved in establishing its drama club. Davis served as U. S. Consul to Florence from 1893 to 1897. 

Davis married Dai Turgeon in 1914; they divorced in 1921.

Bibliography
The Borderland of Society, H. S. Stone & Co., New York (1898), a collection of short stories
Nothing a Year (1916)
The Stage Door, C. Scribner's sons, New York (1908)
Tales of the Town (1911)
The Lodger Overhead, and other stories,  Charles Scribner's, New York
In Another Moment
Adventures and Letters of Richard Harding (1917)
Her Own Sort
In Another Moment

Filmography
Mother o' Mine (1921)
The Home Stretch (1921)
Handle with Care (1922 film)

References

External links
Findagrave entry
Photo of C. B. Davis at the Library of Congress

1866 births
1926 deaths
19th-century American writers
20th-century American writers
American writers
Writers from Philadelphia
Lehigh University alumni
Writers from Pennsylvania